Bardabad (also Romanized as Bardābād; also known as Badrābād) is a village in Hamaijan Rural District, Hamaijan District, Sepidan County, Fars Province, Iran. At the 2006 census, its population was 119, in 27 families.

References 

Populated places in Sepidan County